Gilport Lions Football Club is a soccer club from Botswana based in Lobatse. Gilport Lions team colours are green and white. The club was previously called Botswana Meat Commission F.C.. They have won the FA Challenge Cup in 2007.

History
The club was founded in 1969 by workers at the Botswana Meat Commission in Lobatse. They won the 2007 FA Challenge Cup, defeating ECCO City Greens F.C. on penalties. They also made the cup final in 1996, losing 2–0 to Township Rollers. In 2015, the club's ownership changed, with owners Kelesitse and Portia Gilika changing the club's name to Gilport Lions. The word "Gilport" is derived from their names.

Stadium
Gilport Lions F.C. plays at Lobatse Stadium, which is situated between the hills in Lobatse, Peleng, next to Peleng river and around 75 km from Gaborone Athletic track and indoor sports arena. Its capacity is 22,000 and it has 5 entrances, 4 changing rooms (two for ladies and two for Gents), a medical room, VIP Grand stand with VIP Lounge, commentator box, media lounge, VIP parking and a DJ box. And offering buffet with the finest cuts of meat that the commission can provide  .

Performance in CAF competitions
CAF Cup – 1996
defeated by Mamelodi Sundowns in the first round
FA Vase Winners 2017 beating Tamworth rovers in the final

References

Football clubs in Lobatse
1969 establishments in Botswana
Association football clubs established in 1969